Ingmar Ott  (born 14 September 1955) is an Estonian botanist.

He was born in Tartu.

In 1980, he graduated from the University of Tartu in biology. In 1984, he became affiliated with the Estonian Institute of Zoology and Botany.

1992–2001 he was the head of Võrtsjärv Limnology Centre.

References

External links
CV, Estonian Science Portal

20th-century Estonian botanists
1955 births
Living people
Scientists from Tartu
University of Tartu alumni
Academic staff of the University of Tartu
Academic staff of the Estonian University of Life Sciences
21st-century Estonian botanists